Karell Peña Ventoza (born January 1, 1989 in Ciego de Ávila) is a male beach volleyball player from Cuba, who twice won the silver medal in the men's competition at the NORCECA Beach Volleyball Circuit 2009 in Cayman Islands) and Guatemala, partnering Sergio González.

Playing with Alex Ruiz, they finished 4th at II ALBA games. With Javier Jimenez, he won the silver medal at Cuban National Games, in 2008.

Awards

National Team
 NORCECA Beach Volleyball Circuit Boca Chica 2009  Gold Medal
 NORCECA Beach Volleyball Circuit Guatemala 2009  Silver Medal
 NORCECA Beach Volleyball Circuit Cayman Islands 2009  Silver Medal
 IV Olimpiada Nacional del Deporte Cubano  Silver Medal

References

 Karell Pena at the Beach Volleyball Database
 FIVB Beach Profile

1988 births
Living people
Cuban beach volleyball players
Men's beach volleyball players
People from Ciego de Ávila